Botryosphaeria disrupta is a plant pathogen that causes canker and dieback in several important plant species such as mango and avocado.

References

External links 
 USDA ARS Fungal Database

Fungal tree pathogens and diseases
Mango tree diseases
Avocado tree diseases
disrupta
Fungi described in 1954